Crassula ausensis is a species of succulent in the genus Crassula found in Namibia. Crassula ausensis subsp. giessii and Crassula ausensis subsp. titanopsis are varieties of the species.

Description
The leaves have pink, turquoise and brown markings and generally are considered one of the more beautiful Crassula. It blooms in blooms in late fall with white flowers.

Crassula ausensis subsp. titanopsis

Crassula ausensis subsp. titanopsis is a variety of the species found in southwest Namibia. It blooms small white flowers in late fall to early winter.

References

Flora of Namibia
ausensis